Isabel Brilhante Pedrosa (born 1964) is a Portuguese diplomat, who serves as the European Union Ambassador to Venezuela. She has been the ambassador since February 2018.

Career
Brilhante Pedrosa had served as Portugal's Consul General in Caracas as well as Portugal's ambassador to Namibia (she presented her credentials on July 20, 2016) and Libya.

In February 2018, she became the European Union Ambassador to Venezuela. On June 29, 2020, Nicolás Maduro expelled Brilhante Pedrosa, giving her 72 hours to leave the country, but the decision was later reversed. On 24 February 2021, the ruling party controlled National Assembly in Venezuela called on the government to expel her, following new sanctions by the bloc against 19 Venezuelan officials. Maduro's government declared her persona non grata afterwards, and once more gave her 72 hours to leave the country. Brilhante Pedrosa left after a week.

References

1964 births
Ambassadors of Portugal to Libya
Ambassadors of Portugal to Namibia
Ambassadors of the European Union to Venezuela
Portuguese women diplomats
Portuguese women ambassadors
Living people
21st-century diplomats
Consuls